The International Emmy Award for Best Performance by an Actress is an award presented annually by the International Academy of Television Arts and Sciences (IATAS). The award honors the best performance by an actress in a made for-television fiction program (i.e. movie, mini-series, drama series, telenovela, or comedy series).

Since its inception, the award has been given to 17 actresses. Lou de Laâge is the current recipient of the award, for her portrayal of Eugéne Cléry in The Mad Women's Ball. Julie Walters has won the most awards in this category, with two awards.

Rules and regulations
The International Emmy Award for Best Actress is awarded to a female performance in a made-for-television fiction program (it can be a television film, mini-series, drama series, telenovela, or comedy series). Under International Academy rules, only performances from a program entered in the competition are eligible. The same actress can be featured for different productions, as separate submissions. More than one female performance of the same production may also be presented. A performer must appear for at least 10% of the total airtime of the featured episode to be eligible. If the performance is part of a series, only one episode must have its first broadcast within the listed eligibility dates.

History
The first actress to win the International Emmy was the Chinese He Lin for Slave Mother, a television film produced by the CCTV6 channel. Dutch Maryam Hassouni won in 2006 for her performance as Laila al Gatawi in Offers, a drama thriller directed by Dana Nechushtan. In 2007, the International Emmy for best actress was given to French Muriel Robin for her role as Marie Besnard in the Belgian-French film The Poisoner.
 
British actresses Lucy Cohu, Julie Walters and Helena Bonham Carter won in subsequent years, Walters being the only two-time winner, in 2009 for her role as Anne Turner in A Short Stay in Switzerland, and in 2011 for her performance in the biographical film Mo, which tells the life story of Labour Party politician Mo Mowlam.

The first Emmy for best actress for Latin America was won by Argentina's Cristina Banegas, for her role in miniseries Televisión por la Inclusión, followed by the Brazilian Fernanda Montenegro in 2013. In 2014, Dutch Bianca Krijgsman was honored for her performance in A New World, a film that talks about a chance encounter between her character and an African refugee that leads her to an unexpected relationship. Norwegian actress Anneke von der Lippe won the 2015 Emmy for her role in Øyevitne, a thriller noir created and directed by Jarl Emsell Larsen. She had already received an award nomination in 2005 for her performance in the miniseries Ved Kongens Bord, but lost to Chinese He Lin at the time. 

In 2016, Christiane Paul won the Emmy for her portrayal of Elke Seeberg in Unterm Radar, a German television film based on a book written by Henriette Bruegger. In the film, her daughter is suspected of having participated in a terrorist attack in Berlin. Anna Friel won her first Emmy for her character Marcella Backland in the British Nordic-noir drama series Marcella in 2017.

Anna Schudt played comedian Gaby Köster in Ein Schnupfen hätte auch gereicht, a biopic based on her homonymous autobiography. In 2019, Marina Gera won Hungary's first International Emmy Award for her lead role in Eternal Winter.

Winners and nominees

2000s

2010s

2020s

Photo gallery

Multiple nominations

Most nominations by a female actor

Most nominations by a Program

Most nominations by country

Multiple wins
Most awards won by a female

Most awards won by a country

References

External links
 2013 Emmy Awards
 International Emmy Awards

Actress

Television awards for Best Actress